Glenea leucospilota is a species of beetle in the family Cerambycidae. It was described by John O. Westwood in 1841, originally under the genus Colobothea. It is known from the Philippines.

References

leucospilota
Beetles described in 1841